Three Mothers may refer to:
 The Three Mothers, a trilogy of supernatural horror films
 Three Mothers (2006 film), an Israeli drama film